Remon Castrocol was Bishop of Zaragoza between 1201 and 1216.

In 1205 he gave gifts to the villages of Daroca (Forcallo, Fussed, Tramasaguas).
On June 13, 1210 he signed an agreement with Gombal, Bishop of Tortosa demarcating the limits with the Diocese of Tortosa, Calaceite, Lledo, Arens de Lledó and Algars in Tortosa.

He died in 1216 AD.

References 

1216 deaths
Archbishops of Zaragoza